Mary Leopoldina Burns (August 28, 1856 – June 3, 1942), was an American religious sister who was a member of the Sisters of St Francis of Syracuse, New York, and a close companion and biographer of Saint Marianne Cope during the 1883 Hansen's Disease epidemic on the island of Molokaʻi, Hawaii.

Born on August 28, 1856, she was the daughter of James and Mary Burns, of Utica, New York. She joined the Sisters of St Francis of Syracuse, New York in 1881.

Together with Mother Marianne Cope and 5 other sisters, they departed from Syracuse to travel to Honolulu to answer the request of King Kalākaua of Hawaii to care for leprosy sufferers arriving on November 8, 1883. They traveled on the SS Mariposa. With Mother Marianne as supervisor, the Sisters' task was to manage Kakaʻako Branch Hospital on Oʻahu, which served as a receiving station for Hansen's disease patients gathered from all over the islands. The more severe cases were processed and shipped to the island of Molokaʻi for confinement in the settlement at Kalawao, and then later at Kalaupapa.

In 1889, together with Mother Marianne and Sister Vincentia McCormick, they opened and ran a girls' school in Hawaii, which they named in Henry Perrine Baldwin's honor, a prominent local businessman who supported their missions.

After serving for nearly 40 years on Molokai, she retired in 1928 to the St. Francis Convent in Manoa Valley where she lived until her death.

Sister Leopoldina died on June 3, 1942 with the reputation for holiness. She was the last of the Catholic sisters to serve alongside Father Damien.

References 

1856 births
1942 deaths
Third Order Regular Franciscans
19th-century American Roman Catholic nuns
Female Roman Catholic missionaries
Roman Catholic missionaries in Hawaii
People from Kalawao County, Hawaii
American Roman Catholic missionaries
People from Molokai
20th-century American Roman Catholic nuns
People from Utica, New York
Catholics from New York (state)
Catholics from Hawaii
Educators from New York (state)
American women educators